The Battle of San Cristóbal was a battle of the Thousand Days' War. Colombian troops besieged San Cristóbal (Venezuela) and took the city between 28 and 29 July 1901.

References

Conflicts in 1901
Thousand Days' War
History of Panama
1900s in Panama